Ingrid Ødegård (born 1 March 1983, in Trondheim) is a former Norwegian handball goalkeeper, who last played for Byåsen HE.

Club career 
Ingrid Ødegård started her professional career in Sola HK, Stavanger. After three seasons with the club, she received an offer from Larvik HK and started playing for the Norwegian champion in 2005. With Larvik, she won the Norwegian Championship several times and the Cup Winners' Cup in 2008. However, being the substitute of Lene Rantala, Ødegård could not enjoy much playing time. In 2008, she left Larvik and moved to Denmark to play for FCM Håndbold and in 2012 went on to play for HC Odense. After returning to the Norwegian league in 2014, and playing for Byåsen HE, Ødegård announced in late December 2015 that she is pregnant yet again and has decided to retire.

National team

Handball 
Ingrid Ødegård made her debut on the national team at junior level in 2002. In 2003, she won a bronze medal at the Junior World Championship, together with Linn-Kristin Riegelhuth, Linn Jørum Sulland and Gøril Snorroeggen among others.

Ødegård debuted with the senior national team in June 2010 against Denmark, and played 11 matches for the senior Norwegian national team in total.

Beach handball 
Ødegård received a bronze medal at the 2007 European Beach Handball Championship, where she was named Best Goalkeeper. In 2009, she was part of the team that won a silver medal at the European Championship in Larvik. She received her first gold medal at the 2010 World Championship in Turkey.

References 

1983 births
Living people
Sportspeople from Trondheim
Norwegian female handball players
Expatriate handball players